Deh-e Pain (also Romanized as Deh-e Pā’īn; also known as Pā’īn) is a village in Kal Rural District, Eshkanan District, Lamerd County, Fars Province, Iran. At the 2006 census, its population was 128, in 27 families.

References 

Populated places in Lamerd County